The dhantal (dandtal) is a long steel rod based percussion instrument (sounding similar to the triangle), which was adapted from the  iron "bows" that yoked the oxen that pulled the carts on the estates in Guyana, Suriname, Jamaica, Trinidad and Tobago, other parts of the Caribbean, Fiji, Mauritius, and South Africa. The original beater was an actual horseshoe, a shape which is still retained in the dhantal's modern context as a musical instrument. Its top may be blunt or tapered to a fine point to allow for greater resonance, and its end is shaped into a circle that rests on the ground, table, or other surface when it is played. It is usually about a meter long and 3/8" to 1/2" thick.

History

The dhantal (also called the dhandataal) is of Indian origin, but most commonly found in the Caribbean and Fiji. The instrument was brought to the Caribbean and to the Fiji Islands by indentured laborers from India. The instrument's name literally means "stick percussion" from danda, "stick," and taal, the act of striking rhythmically. That is ll.

Technique

The dhantal is played by striking a metal rod (usually iron or steel) with a metal beater shaped like a horseshoe. The amount of resonance is controlled by opening and closing the hand that is holding the rod. The dhantal's timbre is sharply metallic and provides a clearly defined tal (beat or pulse) to help the ensemble stay in rhythmic sync. The basic rhythm of the dhantal is an ostinato consisting of two sixteenth-notes followed by an eighth-note. This rhythm has a similar "feel" to the merengue music of the Dominican Republic, which itself was based on an African rhythm brought to the Caribbean through the Afro-Caribbean diaspora. An example of how the Dhantal works can be seen in the  Dhantal Lesson YouTube video.

See also
 Chutney music

References

External links
 Lesson on how to play a dhantal on YouTube

Stick percussion idiophones
Caribbean musical instruments
Trinidad and Tobago musical instruments
Fijian musical instruments